Theóphile Auguste Stahl (Bergamo, May 23, 1828 – Brumath, Alsace, October 30, 1877) or simply Augusto Stahl, as he was known in Brazil, was a French photographer who lived during the 19th century. Born in Bergamo, in Italy, son of a Lutheran priest, Stahl disembarked in Recife on December 31, 1853, on board the ship Thames, of the Royal Mail. He operated in Pernambuco until 1861, moving to Rio de Janeiro and receiving from the emperor D. Pedro II the title of Photographo da Casa Imperial (Photographer of the Imperial House), on April 21, 1862. A landscaper photographer, Stahl demonstrated interest for the tropical nature. He also documented the construction of the second Brazilian railway and the visit of Dom Pedro II to Recife, in 1858. He participated in various expositions of photographies in the 1860s. Stahl is known also for portraiting the everyday life of the Black slave.

References

External links

 Mini-biography of Augusto Stahl
 Photojournalism in Nineteenth Century Brazil: A Methodological Approach (Essay focuses on the works of Augusto Stahl and Revert Henrique Klumb)

Artists from Bergamo
German emigrants to Brazil
Brazilian photographers
1828 births
1877 deaths